President Warfield may refer to:

 S. Davies Warfield, an American banker and railroad magnate
 The passenger liner President Warfield, later renamed

See also
 Warfield (disambiguation)